The 2016 World Karate Championships were the 23rd edition of the World Karate Championships, and were held in Linz, Austria from October 25 to October 30, 2016.

Medalists

Men

Women

Medal table

Participating nations 
1024 athletes from 118 nations competed.

 (2)
 (3)
 (14)
 (1)
 (5)
 (6)
 (11)
 (15)
 (14)
 (7)
 (7)
 (9)
 (14)
 (4)
 (16)
 (8)
 (10)
 (15)
 (12)
 (13)
 (13)
 (11)
 (6)
 (6)
 (3)
 (16)
 (2)
 (3)
 (7)
 (14)
 (14)
 (10)
 (16)
 (13)
 (4)
 (2)
 (8)
 (16)
 (7)
 (14)
 (11)
 (11)
 (7)
 (14)
 (12)
 (5)
 (16)
 (13)
 (16)
 (8)
 (12)
 (9)
 (16)
 (1)
 (16)
 (4)
 (13)
 (15)
 (8)
 (7)
 (3)
 (2)
 (4)
 (2)
 (9)
 (12)
 (2)
 (7)
 (3)
 (1)
 (14)
 (2)
 (12)
 (10)
 (8)
 (1)
 (10)
 (9)
 (4)
 (4)
 (2)
 (1)
 (2)
 (4)
 (3)
 (13)
 (15)
 (15)
 (1)
 (4)
 (15)
 (16)
 (2)
 (1)
 (8)
 (1)
 (9)
 (16)
 (15)
 (13)
 (13)
 (10)
 (16)
 (5)
 (2)
 (11)
 (3)
 (13)
 (16)
 (15)
 (6)
 (16)
 (2)
 (10)
 (12)
 (7)
 (6)
 (1)

References

External links
 World Karate Federation
 Official website
 Results

World Championships, 2016
2016 in Austrian sport
2016
Karate Championships
Karate competitions in Austria
Sports competitions in Linz
October 2016 sports events in Europe